France women's national inline hockey team is the national team for France. The team finished first at the 2021 FIRS Inline Hockey World Championships.

References 

National inline hockey teams
Inline hockey in France
Women's national sports teams of France